Tianjin Dongli (Simplified Chinese: 天津东丽) was a football club based in Tianjin, China.

External links
http://www.ctdlty.com/

Defunct football clubs in China
Football clubs in China
Sport in Tianjin
2006 establishments in China